Los Pinos Peak is a  summit in the Santa Ana Mountains in Orange County, California, about  east of Rancho Santa Margarita. Los Pinos is the southernmost peak above  in the Santa Anas, and provides extensive views south towards San Diego and the Pacific Ocean as well as views (on clear days) of the San Jacinto Mountains and San Bernardino Mountains in the east.

The peak is situated in the Cleveland National Forest and is accessible by the Main Divide Road (a fire road); the Trabuco Canyon Trail, which begins near Trabuco Creek, and the Los Pinos Peak Trail, which begins in Hot Springs Canyon (near San Juan Canyon, San Juan Creek and the Ortega Highway (State Route 74).

References

Mountains of Orange County, California
Mountains of Southern California